L'Émission politique (English: "The Political Show") is a French political television programme hosted by Léa Salamé broadcast twice a month on France 2 from 15 September 2016 to 22 May 2019. Broadcast during prime time on Thursday evenings, it replaced Des paroles et des actes, which was aired from 2011 to 2016, during the 2017 French presidential election. David Pujadas co-hosted the programme during its first season and Thomas Sotto during its last season.

List of episodes

Season 1

Season 2

Season 3

References

2016 French television series debuts
2017 French presidential election
2019 French television series endings
French television news shows